The 1960 Belgian motorcycle Grand Prix was the fourth round of the 1960 Grand Prix motorcycle racing season. It took place on 3 July 1960 at the Circuit de Spa-Francorchamps.

500 cc classification

250 cc classification

125 cc classification

Sidecar classification

References

Belgian motorcycle Grand Prix
Belgian
Motorcycle Grand Prix